The Anglican Diocese of Calabar is one of ten within the Anglican Province of the Niger Delta, itself one of 14 provinces within the Church of Nigeria. The current bishop is Tunde Adeleye, who is also Archbishop of the Province.

Notes

Dioceses of the Province of Niger Delta
 
Calabar